Filofax is a company based in the UK that produces a range of personal organiser wallets. The organisers are traditionally leather bound and have a six-ring loose-leaf binder system. The design originated at Lefax, a United States company from Philadelphia which was exporting products to the UK. The company also markets a range of personal leather goods and luggage under the "Filofax" brand.

Products

The name originates from an abbreviation of the phrase "file of facts". This name for the product was first coined when the UK company was founded in 1921. The popularity of the Filofax personal organiser grew enormously during the early 1980s due to its association with Yuppie culture, where it was regarded as a "must-have" accessory, in the days before electronic organisers.

A range of insert page formats are sold including calendars, notesheets, password lists and a thin calculator.

Company
The company was known as Norman & Hill until the mid-1980s, when it renamed itself after its most popular product. For much of its life it was based in South Woodford, East London. In the early 1980s, it moved to Barkingside, Essex. It was bought by David Collischon. In the early 1990s it moved its offices back to London and subcontracted its warehouse operation to Crick in Northamptonshire. The company was acquired by Day Runner, Inc. in 1998. In 2001, Day Runner, Inc. sold Filofax.

Filofax is part of the UK-based Letts Group. In 2006, Phoenix Equity Partners led a secondary buy out of the business. The deal provided an exit for private equity firm Dunedin Capital Partners. In 2012, the company was acquired by HSGP Investments.

References

External links
 

Office equipment
Personal information managers
Companies established in 1921
1921 establishments in the United Kingdom